Mayville is an unincorporated community in Gilliam County, Oregon, United States. It is located on Oregon Route 19. According to 1909 Oregon law, Mayville was the permanent meeting place of the board of commissioners of  Gilliam and Wheeler counties.  They met in Mayville each year to elect the president of the board. A post office was established in Mayville and "put in operation in October 1884 with Samuel Thornton postmaster." The community's name was originally made by Thornton's wife.

See also
 List of cities and unincorporated communities in Oregon

References

Unincorporated communities in Gilliam County, Oregon
1884 establishments in Oregon
Populated places established in 1884
Unincorporated communities in Oregon